Bigg Boss Tamil Season 1 was the first season of the Tamil-language  reality TV show Bigg Boss Tamil which is the Tamil version of the Big Brother. The first season aired on Star Vijay from June 25th 2017 to September 30th 2017. Bigg Boss Tamil – Revealed: The real contestants of Bigg Boss Tamil |publisher=Timesofindia.indiatimes.com |date=2017-06-26 |access-date=2017-07-23}}</ref> The season's presenter was Kamal Haasan and a lavish house set was constructed at EVP theme park, Chennai. This season is the shortest season in the Bigg Boss Tamil series excluding the Ultimate series.

The winner of the season was model/actor Aarar Nafeez, who received a cash prize of 50 lakh. Lyricist Snehan Sivaselvam was the runner-up.

Snehan, Suja Varunee and Maria Juliana returned as contestants in Bigg Boss Ultimate (season 1). While Bindu Madhavi returned as a contestant in Bigg Boss Non-Stop (season 1) and eventually she won it.

Housemate status

Housemates

Original entrants
 Sri, an actor best known for playing the lead role in the films Vazhakku Enn 18/9 (2012) and Maanagaram (2017).
 Anuya Bhagvath, an actress best known for playing the lead role in Siva Manasula Sakthi (2009).
 Vaiyapuri, an actor who has primarily appeared as a comedian in Tamil films.
 Gayathri Raghuram, an actress, choreographer and politician who has worked in Tamil films. Daughter of choreographer Raghuram.
 Bharani, an actor best known for playing a lead role in Naadodigal (2009).
 Raiza Wilson, a model and former beauty-pageant contestant from Bangalore.
 Snehan, a lyricist, poet, actor and motivational speaker who has worked in Tamil films.
 Oviya, an actress who has appeared in leading roles in the films Kalavani (2010), Marina (2012) and Kalakalappu (2012). 
 Harathi Ganesh, an actress who has primarily appeared as a comedienne in Tamil films.
 Arav Nafeez, a model and actor from Tiruchchirapalli who has starred in Saithan (2016).
 Ganja Karuppu, an actor who has primarily appeared as a comedian in Tamil films.
 Maria Juliana, a former nurse who rose to fame as an activist during the 2017 Jallikattu protests.
 Ganesh Venkatraman, an actor and former model who has appeared in supporting roles in the films Abhiyum Naanum (2008), Unnaipol Oruvan (2009), and Thani Oruvan (2015).
 Shakthi Vasudevan, an actor best known for playing leading roles in Thottal Poo Malarum (2007) and Shivalinga (2017), son of director P. Vasu.
 Namitha, an actress who has appeared in leading roles in the films Aai (2004), Billa (2007) and Azhagiya Tamil Magan (2007).

Wildcard entrants
 Bindu Madhavi, an actress who has appeared in leading roles in the films Kazhugu (2012), Kedi Billa Killadi Ranga (2013), and Desingu Raja (2013).
 Suja Varunee, an actress and dancer who has appeared in supporting roles in the films Milaga (2010) and Pencil (2016).
 Harish Kalyan, an actor best known for playing leading roles in the films Sindhu Samaveli (2010) and Poriyaalan (2014).
 Kaajal Pasupathi, an actress and video jockey known for her roles in Ko (2011) and Mounaguru (2011).

Nominations table

Notes

 indicates the House Captain.
 indicates that the housemate was directly nominated for eviction prior to the regular nominations process.
 indicates that the housemate was granted immunity from nominations.
 indicates that an evicted housemate returned temporarily to the house as a guest.
 indicates that the housemate moved to the Secret Room.
: Sri left the show on day 4 because of his poor health conditions.
: Bharani was ejected from the show for breaking the Bigg Boss rule by trying to escape from the house.
: Raiza was automatically nominated for eviction for Week 5 during Week 4 as punishment for talking about the eviction nominees despite being forbidden to do so.
: There was no eviction during Week 5; however, the housemates still nominated their fellow housemates for eviction without knowing that there would be no eviction.
: Snehan was saved from eviction while Vaiyapuri was nominated for eviction for Week 6 during Week 5 by Arav and Gayathri, who both had the power to save and nominate one housemate each for eviction in their role of Junior Bigg Boss for a day.
: As the new housemate, Bindu Madhavi was granted immunity from nomination for Week 6.
: There was no House Captain for Weeks 6, 10 and 14.
: After ending up on the losing side in a daily task during Week 6, housemates in the winning team nominated Arav for eviction for Week 7.
: Oviya left the show because of mental stress arising due to tension in relationships with Arav and the other housemates.
: All the housemates except Raiza (and Arav who was already nominated) were nominated for eviction for Week 7 as they did not provide valid reasons while nominating a housemate for eviction, as a result of which Raiza became the House Captain for Week 7 by default.
: Vaiyapuri was chosen to be saved from the Week 7 eviction by the other housemates.
: Gayathri was saved from Week 7 eviction after winning a task in which housemates had to answer five questions about the Bigg Boss house.
: As the new housemates, Suja, Harish and Kajal were granted immunity from nominations for Weeks 8 and 9.
: After winning a daily task during Week 8, Arav was granted immunity from nomination for Week 9.
: Snehan was nominated for Week 10 eviction during Week 9 at the end of the luxury budget task wherein the nomination for Week 10 eviction changed between the housemates.
: Although Harathi, Juliana and Shakthi were guests in the Bigg Boss house and ex-contestants, they were allowed to nominate the other housemates for eviction.
: Though Snehan received a sufficient number of votes to be nominated for Week 11 eviction, he was saved from nomination by Ganesh with the help of the joker card he received as a prize for winning a daily task during Week 8. After being saved, Snehan nominated Bindu as his replacement for Week 11 eviction.
: Suja was evicted by the regular eviction process, however in accordance with the Secret Room twist, she was moved to a temporary abode and stayed there for a day before returning to the house on Day 78. Following her return, she has also exempted from nomination for the Week 12 eviction, though she could nominate the other housemates.
: Even though Arav was the House Captain for Week 12, he was still eligible to be nominated for Week 12 eviction.
: As Snehan won the Golden Ticket during Week 12, he was granted immunity till the final week.
: Since Snehan was already a finalist, he was made House Captain for Week 13 by default while the rest of the housemates were automatically nominated for eviction.
: All finalists were nominated for a mid-week eviction. Bindu was evicted and decalred as the 4th runner up of Bigg Boss during the mid-week eviction as she received the fewest public votes to win Bigg Boss.

Guests

Controversies

 Bigg Boss Tamil 1 fame Bharani was eliminated from the show as he tried to escape the BB house by jumping off the wall. He was mentally strained due to the treatment of the housemates. His exit sparked a controversy with the viewers slamming the contestants for their inappropriate behaviour towards Bharani.

Weekly summary

Reception

After the launch of the show, the viewership of the channel increased by 10%. The series garnered a low rating of 5.2 TVR in debut week with 5.6 million impressions and 5.4 million impressions for premiere episode. It improved further the following weeks where it averaged 8.4 TVR for a six weeks average ratings.

References

External links
 Official Website on Hotstar

Tamil 1
Star Vijay original programming
Tamil-language comedy television series
Tamil-language reality television series
Tamil-language game shows
Tamil-language television shows
2010s Tamil-language television series
2017 Tamil-language television series endings
2017 Indian television seasons